Uncle Bob is the name of:
 Robert C. Martin, American software consultant and author
 Robert Mugabe (1924–2019), second president of Zimbabwe (1987—2017), previously prime minister (1980–1987)
 Robert M. Veatch (1843–1925), American politician from Oregon
 Robert Stewart (entrepreneur)

See also
 Uncle Bob's Self Storage, American self-storage company
 Unkle Bob, Scottish band
 Bob's your uncle (disambiguation)